Juho Alasuutari (born 11 June 1990) is a Finnish footballer who plays as a midfielder for Finnish club GBK Kokkola.

References

1990 births
Living people
Finnish footballers
People from Ylivieska
Association football midfielders
Vaasan Palloseura players
FC YPA players
Veikkausliiga players
Kakkonen players
GBK Kokkola players
Sportspeople from North Ostrobothnia